Alexander Vladimirovich Galibin (born 27 September 1955) is a Soviet and Russian actor noted for playing the Master in the miniseries The Master and Margarita (2005).

His acting career spans over four decades and includes such memorable roles as Tsar Nicholas II in Gleb Panfilov's The Romanovs: A Crowned Family (2000).

Biography
Alexander Galibin was born in Leningrad, Russian SFSR, Soviet Union. He first started his acting career as a theater actor at the Theater of Youth Creativity directed by Matvey Dubrovin. From 1973 to 1977, he studied acting at the Faculty of LGITMiK. His film debut was in the 1976 film I drugie ofitsialnye litsa.

From 1977 to 1979 – Actor the Komissarjevsky Theatre. He played in the performances: "The Legend of the dunce's hat" (King Philip), "Five Evenings" (Glory), "Bumbarash" (Lyovka), "Tsar Boris" (the shadow of Tsarevich Dmitry, Chechen, Fyodor Godunov), "Ten unopened letters" (builders of BAM) and others.

Filmography
 Shadows over Balkan (2017) TV series – General Vrangel
Adel  (2008)
Svoy-chuzhoy  (2007) TV series
On, ona i ya  (2007)
Konservy  (2007)
Master i Margarita  (2005) TV mini-series
Ragin  (2004)
Romanovy: Ventsenosnaya semya  (2000)
Ono  (1989)
Muzh i doch' Tamary Aleksandrovny  (1988)
Dzhek Vosmyorkin, amerikanets  (1987)
Serebryanye struny  (1987)
Isklyuchenie bez pravil  (1986) (TV)
Put k sebe  (1986) TV mini-series
Stepnaya eskadrilya  (1986)
Zhizn Klima Samgina  (1986)
Batalyony prosyat ognya  (1985) TV mini-series
Koordinaty smerti  (1985)
Moy izbrannik  (1984)
Ya za tebya otvechayu  (1984)
Bez osobogo riska  (1983)
Pristupit k likvidatsii  (1983)
Privet s fronta  (1983) (TV)
Trevozhnyy vylet  (1983)
Moya lubov-revolutsiya  (1982)
Nas venchali ne v tserkvi  (1982)
The Donkey's Hide  (1982)
Shestoy  (1981)
Skazka, rasskazannaya nochyu  (1981)
Sto radostey, ili kniga velikikh otkrytiy  (1981)
Kto zaplatit za udachu?  (1980)
Takiye zhe, kak my!  (1980)
The Tavern on Pyatnitskaya  (1978)
I drugie ofitsialnye litsa  (1976)

Awards
Merited Artist of the Russian Federation (1991)
People's Artist of the Russian Federation (2006)

References

External links

1955 births
Living people
Soviet male stage actors
Soviet male film actors
Soviet male television actors
Russian male stage actors
Russian male film actors
Russian male television actors
20th-century Russian male actors
21st-century Russian male actors
Male actors from Saint Petersburg
People's Artists of Russia
Honored Artists of the RSFSR
Soviet theatre directors
Russian State Institute of Performing Arts alumni
Russian Academy of Theatre Arts alumni
Russian television presenters